Vuattouxia is a monotypic genus of Ivorian nursery web spiders containing the single species, Vuattouxia kouassikonani. It was first described by P. Blandin in 1979, and is only found in the Ivory Coast.

See also
 List of Pisauridae species

References

Endemic fauna of Ivory Coast
Monotypic Araneomorphae genera
Pisauridae
Spiders of Africa